Ronda is a town in the Spanish province of Málaga. Its population is about 35,000. Ronda is known for its cliff-side location and a deep chasm that carries the Guadalevín River and divides the town.

It is now one of the towns and villages that is included in the Sierra de las Nieves Natural Park.

History
Around the city are remains of prehistoric settlements dating to the Neolithic Age, including the rock paintings of Cueva de la Pileta. Ronda was, however, first settled by the early Celts, who called it Arunda in the sixth century BC. Later Phoenician settlers established themselves nearby to found Acinipo (sometimes referred to as Ronda la Vieja, Old Ronda). The current Ronda is of Roman origins, having been founded as a fortified post in the Second Punic War, by Scipio Africanus. Ronda received the title of city at the time of Julius Caesar.

In the fifth century AD, Ronda was conquered by the Suebi, led by Rechila, being reconquered in the following century  by the Eastern Roman Empire, under whose rule Acinipo was abandoned. Later, the Visigoth king Leovigild captured the city. Ronda was part of the Visigoth realm until 713, when it fell to the Umayyad troops, who named it Hisn Ar-Rundah ("Castle of Rundah") and made it the capital of the Takurunna province.

It was the hometown of the polymath Abbas Ibn Firnas (810–887), an inventor, engineer, alleged aviator, chemist, physician, Muslim poet, and Andalusian musician.

After the disintegration of the caliphate of Córdoba, Ronda became the capital of a small kingdom ruled by the Berber Banu Ifran, the taifa of Ronda. During this period, Ronda gained most of its Islamic architectural heritage. In 1065, Ronda was conquered by the taifa of Seville led by Abbad II al-Mu'tadid. Both the poet Salih ben Sharif al-Rundi (1204–1285) and the Sufi scholar Ibn Abbad al-Rundi (1333–1390) were born in Ronda.

The Islamic domination of Ronda ended in 1485, when it was conquered by the Marquis of Cádiz after a brief siege. Subsequently, most of the city's old edifices were renewed or adapted to Christian roles, while numerous others were built in newly created quarters such as Mercadillo and San Francisco. The Plaza de Toros de Ronda was founded in the town in 1572.

The Spanish Inquisition affected the Muslims living in Spain greatly. Shortly after 1492, when the last outpost of Muslim presence in the Iberian Peninsula, Granada, was conquered, the Spanish decreed that all Muslims must either vacate the peninsula without their belongings or convert. Many people overtly converted to keep their possessions while secretly practicing their religion. Muslims who converted were called Moriscos. They were required to wear upon their caps and turbans a blue crescent. Traveling without a permit meant a death sentence. This systematic suppression forced the Muslims to seek refuge in mountainous regions of southern Andalusia; Ronda was one such refuge.

On May 25, 1566, Philip II decreed the use of the Arabic language (written or spoken) illegal, required that doors to homes remain open on Fridays to verify that no Muslim Friday prayers were conducted, and levied heavy taxes on Morisco trades. This led to several rebellions, one of them in Ronda under the leadership of Al-Fihrey. Al-Fihrey's soldiers defeated the Spanish army sent to suppress them under the leadership of Alfonso de Aguilar. The massacre of the Spaniards prompted Phillip II to order the expulsion of all Moriscos in Ronda.

In the early 19th century, the Napoleonic invasion and the subsequent Peninsular War caused much suffering in Ronda, whose inhabitants were reduced from 15,600 to 5,000 in three years. Ronda's area became the base first of guerrilla warriors, then of numerous bandits, whose deeds inspired artists such as Washington Irving, Prosper Mérimée, and Gustave Doré. In the 19th century, the economy of Ronda was mainly based on agricultural activities. In 1918, the city was the seat of the Assembly of Ronda, in which the Andalusian flag, coat of arms, and anthem were designed.

Ronda's Romero family—from Francisco, born in 1698, to his son Juan, to his famous grandson Pedro, who died in 1839—played a principal role in the development of modern Spanish bullfighting. In a family responsible for such innovations as the use of the cape, or muleta, and a sword especially designed for the kill, Pedro in particular transformed bullfighting into "an art and a skill in its own right, and not simply ... a clownishly macho preamble to the bull's slaughter".

Ronda was heavily affected by the Spanish Civil War, which led to emigration and depopulation. The scene in chapter 10 of Hemingway's For Whom the Bell Tolls, describing the 1936 execution of Fascist sympathisers in a (fictional) village who are thrown off a cliff, is considered to be modeled on actual events of the time in Ronda.

Geography

Also it occupies the depression of Ronda. The inner relief is gentle and includes areas of pastureland and vegetable and cereal growing areas.

The Guadalevín River runs through the city, dividing it in two and carving out the steep, 100-plus-meter-deep El Tajo canyon above which the city perches. The Spanish fir (Abies pinsapo) is endemic to the mountains surrounding Ronda.

Main sights

 Three bridges over the Tajo canyon: 1 - Puente Romano "Roman Bridge",( also known as the Puente Arabe "Arabic Bridge" as the foundation is Roman and was rebuilt above in the Arabic Period ); 2-Puente Viejo"Old Bridge",( also known as the Puente San Miguel); and 3-Puente Nuevo"New Bridge", span the canyon. The term nuevo is something of a misnomer, as the building of this bridge commenced in 1751 and took until 1793 to complete. The former town hall, which stands next to the Puente Nuevo, is the site of a Parador and has a view of the Tajo canyon.

 The 'Corrida Goyesca' is a bullfight that takes place once a year in Ronda in the Plaza de toros de Ronda, the oldest bullfighting ring in Spain. It was built in 1784 in the Neoclassical style by the architect José Martin de Aldehuela, who also designed the Puente Nuevo.
 The partially intact Baños Arabe ("Arabic baths") are found below the city, beside the Puente Arabe ( Also known as the Puente Romano ) and date back to the 13th and 14th centuries. Nowadays you can visit them although you can not enjoy an original Arab bath but you can see all the facilities. The Arab Baths used to fulfil the function of purifying the visitors who came to the city of Ronda. They are the best preserved Arabic baths.

 Plaza del Socorro is the modern political centre of Ronda. It was here that Blas Infante showed the Andalusian flag and coat of arms for the first time in 1918. The parish church of Socorro (Parroquia de Nuestra Señora del Socorro) was only built in 1956. The building known as the Casino and Circulo de Artistas (Artists' Society) is located on the north side of Ronda's Plaza del Socorro.

 The Palacio of the Marqués de Salvatierra opens irregularly as a small museum of Renaissance art and artefacts. The Palacio is an 18th-century renovation of an earlier 16th century building gifted to the family of Don Vasco Martín de Salvatierra by the Catholic Monarchs when they redistributed the spoils of the Reconquest. In 1994, Madonna obtained a permit to shoot inside the palace of the Marquis of Salvatierra for the music video of Take a Bow.

 Despite the name, The Casa del Rey Moro was never the home of a Moorish king. It was built in the 18th century, when Moorish Spain was already a distant memory. Its apparently Moorish gardens are even more recent, having been designed by the French landscape gardener Jean Claude Forestier in 1912. The house does incorporate one genuine and important relic of Ronda's Moorish era: the so-called Water Mine, a set of steps down to the river carved into the cliff wall.
 
 Serranía de Ronda is filled with pueblos blancos which are approachable by car. The position of the town of Ronda provides views over the mountains of Serranía de Ronda.

Cultural influence

American artists Ernest Hemingway and Orson Welles spent many summers in Ronda as part-time residents of Ronda's old-town quarter called La Ciudad. Both wrote about Ronda's beauty and famous bullfighting traditions. Their collective accounts have contributed to Ronda's popularity over time.

In the first decades of the 20th century, the famous German poet Rainer Maria Rilke spent extended periods in Ronda, where he kept a permanent room at the Hotel Reina Victoria (built in 1906); his room remains to this day as he left it, a minimuseum of Rilkeana. According to the hotel's publicity, Rilke wrote (though probably not in Spanish) He buscado por todas partes la ciudad soñada, y al fin la he encontrado en Ronda and No hay nada más inesperado en España que esta ciudad salvaje y montañera ("I have sought everywhere the city of my dreams, and I have finally found it in Ronda" and "Nothing is more startling in Spain than this wild and mountainous city.")

Hemingway's novel For Whom the Bell Tolls describes the execution of Nationalist sympathizers early in the Spanish Civil War. The Republicans murder the Nationalists  by throwing them from cliffs in an Andalusian village, and Hemingway allegedly based the account on killings that took place in Ronda at the cliffs of El Tajo.

Orson Welles said he was inspired by his frequent trips to Spain and Ronda (e.g. his unfinished film about Don Quixote). After he died in 1985, his ashes were buried in a well on the rural property of his friend, retired bullfighter Antonio Ordoñez.

English writer George Eliot's book Daniel Deronda ("Daniel of Ronda") tells the story of a Spanish Jew brought up as an Englishman. Some speculation existed that Eliot's ancestors had lived in Ronda prior to the expulsion of the Jews from Spain in 1492.

In the fashion world, Italian designer Giorgio Armani specially designed the bullfighting costume called ‘Goyesco’ for famed bullfighter Cayetano Rivera Ordóñez on the occasion of the Corrida Goyesca that took place on September 6, 2009, in Ronda. Cayetano's suit of lights was in the Goyaesque style, comprising a jacket, trousers, and cloak in techno-satin. The three pieces were embroidered with sequins, small glitter stones, and thread, all matching the colour of the background fabric.

Ronda was used as the setting for the flower market in the 2017 animated movie Ferdinand.

Transport

Ronda is accessible via highways (Autovía A-374) and by rail from Algeciras and from Córdoba. A direct train from Madrid to Ronda operates twice daily.

The single-track railway between Ronda and Algeciras was built between 1890 and 1892 by the Algeciras Gibraltar Railway Company. It enabled the British military officers to escape the summer heat of Gibraltar. The railway was built by James Morrison, an engineer, in partnership with Alexander Henderson, 1st Baron Faringdon, a financier. The station at Ronda was opened in 1892.

International relations

Twin towns – sister cities
Ronda is twinned with:
  Cuenca, Spain
  Chefchaouen, Morocco 
  Castiglion Fiorentino, Italy
  Ontinyent, Spain
  Ceuta, Spain

References

External links
Ronda Today English language tourist Information about Ronda and surrounding areas.
Ronda T

Municipalities in the Province of Málaga